Taskayevo may refer to:
Taskayevo, name of several rural localities in Russia
Taskayevo, name of Zdvinsk in 1773–1896
stantsii Taskayevo, a settlement in Kemerovo Oblast, Russia

See also
Taskayeva
Tasayevo Airport
Taseyevo